The 1914 Boston Red Sox season was the 14th season in the franchise's Major League Baseball history. The Red Sox finished second in the American League (AL) with a record of 91 wins and 62 losses,  games behind the Philadelphia Athletics. The team played its home games at Fenway Park.

Regular season

Season standings

Record vs. opponents

Opening Day lineup 

Source:

Notable transactions 
 July 9, 1914: Babe Ruth was purchased by the Red Sox from the Baltimore Orioles.

Roster

Player stats

Batting

Starters by position 
Note: Pos = Position; G = Games played; AB = At bats; H = Hits; Avg. = Batting average; HR = Home runs; RBI = Runs batted in

Other batters 
Note: G = Games played; AB = At bats; H = Hits; Avg. = Batting average; HR = Home runs; RBI = Runs batted in

Pitching

Starting pitchers 
Note: G = Games pitched; IP = Innings pitched; W = Wins; L = Losses; ERA = Earned run average; SO = Strikeouts

Other pitchers 
Note: G = Games pitched; IP = Innings pitched; W = Wins; L = Losses; ERA = Earned run average; SO = Strikeouts

Relief pitchers 
Note: G = Games pitched; W = Wins; L = Losses; SV = Saves; ERA = Earned run average; SO = Strikeouts

References

External links
1914 Boston Red Sox team page at Baseball Reference
1914 Boston Red Sox season at baseball-almanac.com

Boston Red Sox seasons
Boston Red Sox
Boston Red Sox
1910s in Boston